Grami's Circus Show is a South Korean slapstick comedy 3D animated television series produced by Studio Gale. It aired on KBS1 and is available on Netflix.

Synopsis
Grami, Nemo and Sam, a trio of three lions and a ringmaster Jack train for and perform their circus show.

Characters

Main characters
 Grami (voiced by Yeo Min-jeong): Grami is the title character of the show. He's a baby lion. He is very optimistic, never takes anything seriously and never gets upset or sad.
 Jack (voiced by Seok-pil Choi): Jack is a strict, dignified and hot-tempered ringmaster who wants to get rich by performing circus shows with lions.
 Nemo (voiced by Seok-pil Choi): Nemo is a lion who came from Africa. He's jealous of Grami. He's dumb, bossy and only uses his power to solve problems. He always wants to gain recognition from Jack.
 Sam (voiced by Um Sang-hyun): Sam is a weakling lion who used to live in a zoo. Nemo picks on Sam since Sam is tenderhearted and weak. He always wants to relax and sleep.

Recurring characters
 Baboo (voiced by Seok-pil Choi): Baboo is intern baboon working at the circus.
 Rabbits (voiced by Kim Hyeon-ji): Rabbits are the audience of the circus show.

Voice cast
 Yeo Min-jeong as Grami, minor characters
 Seok-pil Choi as Jack, Nemo, Baboo, minor characters
 Um Sang-hyun as Sam, minor characters
 Kim Hyeon-ji as Rabbits, minor characters

Crew
 Director: Chang Hwan Shin
 Writers: Heong Myeong Choe, Chang Hwan Shin
 Producers: Eunee Park, Jun Oh and Yu Kyung Lee
 Executive Producers: Chang Hwan Shin
 Supervising Animator: Ki Hong Gil
 Art Director: Seung Min Lee
 Story Board: Hyeon Myeong Choe, Hye Lim Chun and Seung Min Lee
 Animator: Eun Hee Jung and Gwang Hyun Jung
 Modeling: Kwang Il Ahn 
 Lighting Supervisor: Young Suk Kim
 Lighting: Suk Jin Kim, Tae Hwan No, Jun Ho Kim and Hyoung Mo Cho
 Composite: Min Hyeong Chang
 Music By: Mint Condition
 Sound Design: Ji Hee Kim
 Recording & Mixing: Hee Jung Kang

Episodes

Series overview

Season 1

Season 2

Reception

Critical response
Stuart Heritage of The Guardian wrote, "I have to hold my hands up here and admit that I’m slightly obsessed with Grami’s Circus Show. I boggle at the audacity of it. It is so spectacularly inappropriate that watching it is like picking a scab. Watching it with a toddler, as I’ve done by accident, is like playing chicken with object permanence; it’s fun in the moment, but the second any of it sinks in is the moment we’re all screwed."

Accolades
In 2014, the series won a Pulcinella award in the category of "TV Series for Teen", being the only Asian show to do so in that year. The show was also the in the official selections for the SICAF awards but didn't win.

References

External links
 
 Grami's Circus Show on ABC TV

2000s South Korean animated television series
2014 South Korean television series debuts
2010s South Korean animated television series
South Korean children's animated comedy television series